Filippo Brunelleschi (also known as Pippo; 1377 – 15 April 1446), considered to be a founding father of Renaissance architecture, was an Italian architect, designer, and sculptor, and is now recognized to be the first modern engineer, planner, and sole construction supervisor. In 1421, Brunelleschi became the first person to receive a patent in the Western world. He is most famous for designing the dome of the Florence Cathedral, a feat of engineering that had not been accomplished since antiquity, as well as the development of the mathematical technique of linear perspective in art which governed pictorial depictions of space until the late 19th century and influenced the rise of modern science. His accomplishments also include other architectural works, sculpture, mathematics, engineering, and ship design. His principal surviving works can be found in Florence.

Biography

Early life
Brunelleschi was born in Florence, Italy, in 1377. His family consisted of his father, Brunellesco di Lippo (born ), a notary and civil servant, his mother Giuliana Spini, and his two brothers. The family was well-off; the palace of the Spini family still exists, across from the Church of the Trinita in Florence. The young Filippo was given a literary and mathematical education intended to enable him to follow in the footsteps of his father. Being artistically inclined, however, Filippo, at the age of fifteen, was apprenticed to the Arte della Seta, the wool merchants' guild, the wealthiest and most prestigious guild in the city, which also included jewellers and metal craftsmen. In December 1398, he became a master goldsmith and a sculptor working with cast bronze.

Sculpture – Competition for the Florence Baptistry doors
Brunelleschi's earliest extant sculptures are two small bronze statues of evangelists and saints (1399–1400) made for the altar of the Crucifix Chapel Pistoia Cathedral. This work was interrupted near both the beginning and end of 1400, when Brunelleschi was chosen to simultaneously serve two representative councils of the Florentine government for periods of about four months.

Around the end of 1400, the city of Florence decided to create new sculpted and gilded bronze doors for the Florence Baptistery. A competition was held in 1401 for the design, which drew seven competitors, including Brunelleschi and another young sculptor, Lorenzo Ghiberti. For the competition, each sculptor was required to produce a single bronze panel, depicting the Sacrifice of Isaac within a Gothic four-leaf frame. The panels each contained Abraham, Isaac, an angel and other figures imagined by the artists, and had to harmonize in style with the existing doors, made in 1330 by Andrea Pisano. The head of the jury was Giovanni di Bicci de' Medici, who later became an important patron of Brunelleschi. The jury publicly praised Ghiberti's panel before they had seen the finished work of Brunelleschi, but when they saw it, they were unable to choose between the two and suggested that they collaborate on the project. Brunelleschi refused to forfeit total control of the project, preferring it to be awarded to Ghiberti. This divided public opinion on the contest's outcome.

Brunelleschi would eventually abandon sculpture and devote his attention entirely to architecture and optics, but continued to receive sculpture commissions until at least 1416.

Rediscovery of antiquity (1402–1404)
Owing to a resurgence of interest in ancient Greek and Roman culture during the Early Renaissance, artists began to hold the art of Greco-Roman antiquity in higher regard than the formal and less lifelike style of the medieval period, which was largely dominated by Byzantine art. However, this interest was restricted to a few scholars, writers, and philosophers before it began to influence the visual arts. In this period (1402–1404), Brunelleschi visited Rome (possibly with his friend, the sculptor Donatello) to study its ancient ruins. Donatello, like Brunelleschi, was trained as a goldsmith, and later worked in the studio of Ghiberti. Although the glories of Ancient Rome were a matter of popular discourse at the time, few people had actually studied the physical fabric of its ruins in any detail until Brunelleschi and Donatello. Brunelleschi's study of classical Roman architecture can be seen in the characteristic elements of his building designs including even lighting, the minimization of distinct architectural elements within a building, and the balancing of those elements to homogenize the space.

It is speculated that Brunelleschi developed his system of linear perspective after observing the Roman ruins. However, some historians dispute that he visited Rome then, given the number of projects Brunelleschi had in Florence at the time, the poverty and lack of security in Rome during that period, and the lack of evidence of the visit. His first definitively documented visit to Rome was in 1432.

The Foundling Hospital (1419–1445) 

Brunelleschi's first architectural commission was the Ospedale degli Innocenti (1419–c. 1445), or Foundling Hospital, designed as a home for orphans.  The hospital was funded and administered by the Silk Merchants' Guild to which he belonged. As with many of his architectural projects, the building was completed much later, with considerable modifications, by other architects. He was the official architect until 1427, but he was rarely on the site after 1423. The  hospital was completed by the Florentine architect Francesco della Luna in 1445.

The major portion completed by Brunelleschi was an arcade or loggia with nine arches, supported on each side by pilasters, which gave the appearance of columns, and opening to the interior by a small door. The arcade was supported by slender columns with Corinthian capitals. This first arcade, with its columns, rounded arches and simple classical decoration, became the model for a long series of Renaissance buildings across Europe. Its long loggia would have been a rare sight in the tight and curving streets of Florence, not to mention its impressive arches, each about 8 m high. The building was dignified and sober, with no displays of fine marble or decorative inlays. It was also the first building in Florence to make clear reference—in its columns and capitals—to classical antiquity.

Soon, other commissions came, such as the Ridolfi Chapel in the church of San Jacopo sopr'Arno, now lost, and the Barbadori Chapel in Santa Felicita, also modified since its building. For both, Brunelleschi devised elements already used in the Ospedale degli Innocenti, and which would also be used in the Pazzi Chapel and the Sagrestia Vecchia. At the same time, he was using such smaller works as a sort of feasibility study for his most famous work, the dome of the Cathedral of Florence.

Basilica of San Lorenzo (1421–1442)
The Basilica of San Lorenzo was his next great project, undertaken soon after he began the Foundling Hospital. It was the largest church in Florence, sponsored by the Medici family, whose tombs were located there, and it was the work of several different architects, including, later, Michelangelo. The parts undertaken by Brunelleschi were the central nave, with the two collateral naves on either side bordered by small chapels,  and the old sacristy.

The Old Sacristy was begun first, and built between 1419 and 1429. It contains the tomb of the donor, Giovanni di Bicci de' Medici and his wife, beneath a central dome, very simply decorated. A level of ornamental entablements divides the vertical space into two parts, and pilasters support the dome. The altar is set into a recess at one end beneath a smaller dome. All of the arcs of the ceiling are supported by pilasters, like classical columns, set into the walls. This room, using classical elements in an entirely original way, was one of the first perfectly Renaissance spaces.

In the nave, the massive pillars of Gothic architecture were replaced by slender columns with Corinthian capitals,  and the traditional vaulted ceiling of the central nave by a coffered ceiling of square compartments with delicately gilded trim. To adjust to the difference of height between the low chapels and the much higher nave, the circular windows above each chapel.   The finished interior gave an impression of perfect harmony and balance.

One practice of Brunelleschi in the Old Sacristy, which later became a doctrine of Renaissance architecture, was the use of white walls in churches.  The first major theorist of Renaissance art, Leon Battista Alberti, writing in 1450, declared that, since classical times, according to such authorities Cicero and Plato,  white was the only color suitable for a temple or church, and praised "the purity and simplicity of the color, like that of life."

Basilica of Santo Spirito (1434–1466)
The Basilica of Santo Spirito in Florence was his next major project, which, characteristically, he carried out in parallel with his other major works. Though he began designing in 1434, construction did not begin until 1436, and continued beyond his lifetime.  The columns for the facade were not delivered until 1446, ten days before his death, and the facade was not completed until 1482, and then was modified in the 18th century. The bell tower was also a later addition.

Santo Spirito is an example of the mathematical proportion and harmony of Brunelleschi's work.  The church is in the form of a cross. The choir, the two arms of the transept, and the space in the center of the transept are composed of squares exactly the same size.  The continuation of the nave contains four more identical squares. and a half-square (a later addition) at the end. The length of the transept is exactly one-one half of the length of the nave.  Each square of the lower collateral naves is one-quarter the size of the squares in the principal nave.  The collateral naves are lined with thirty-eight small chapels, which were later filled with altars decorated with works of art.

The vertical plan is also perfectly in proportion; the height of the central nave is exactly twice its width, and the height of the collateral naves on either side are exactly twice their width.  Other aspects of his original plan, however,  were modified after his death.  The main aisle of the nave, lined by columns with Corinthian capitals, is topped by a row of semicircular arches, like his galleries.  His original plan called the ceiling of the nave to be composed of a barrel vault, which would have echoed the collateral naves, but this was also changed after his death to the flat coffered ceiling.  Little remains of the exterior walls that he had planned.  They were unfinished at his death, and were covered with a facade in a  different style in the Baroque period.

Pazzi Chapel (1430–1444)
The Pazzi Chapel in Florence was commissioned in about 1429 by Andrea Pazzi to serve as the Chapter House, or meeting place of the monks of the Monastery of Santa Croce.  Like nearly all of his works, the actual construction was delayed, beginning only in 1442, and the interior was not finished until 1444.  The building was not entirely finished until about 1469, twenty years after his death.   Some of the details, such as the lantern on top of the dome, were added after his death.

The portico of the chapel is especially notable for its fine proportions, simplicity, and harmony. Its centerpiece is a sort of arch of triumph. Its six columns are by an entablature sculpted medallions, an upper level divided by pilasters and a central arch, and another band of sculpted entablature the top, below a terrace and the simple cupola. The interior spaces are framed by arches, entablatures, and pilasters. The floor is also divided into geometric sections. Light comes downward from the circular windows of the dome, and changes throughout the day. The interior is given touches of color by circular blue and white ceramic plaques made by the sculptor Luca Della Robbia. The architecture of the chapel is based on an arrangement of rectangles, rather than squares, which makes it appear slightly less balanced than his chapel in the Old Sacristy of San Lorenzo.

Santa Maria degli Angeli (1434–1437)
Santa Maria degli Angeli was an unfinished project by Brunelleschi which introduced a revolutionary concept in  Renaissance architecture.  Churches since the Romanesque and Gothic periods were traditionally in the form of a cross, with the altar in the transept or crossing point.  Santa Maria deli Angeli was designed as a rotunda in an octagon shape, with eight equal sides, each containing a chapel, and the altar in the center.

The financing of the church came from the legacy of two Florentine merchants, Matteo and Andrea Scolari, and construction commenced in 1434. However, in 1437, the money for the church was seized by the Florentine government to help finance a war against the neighboring city of Lucca. The completed part was later integrated into a later church of a different design.

The plans and model of Brunelleschi's church disappeared, and it is known only from an illustration in the Codex Rustichi from 1450, and from drawings of other architects. Leon Battista Alberti, in his De re aedificatoria, the first major treatise on Renaissance architecture, written in about 1455 and published in 1485, hailed the design as the "first complete plan of a Renaissance church." Leonardo da Vinci visited Florence in about 1490, studied Brunelleschi's churches and plans, and sketched a plan for a similar octagonal church with radiating chapels in his notebooks. It reached its fruition on an even larger scale in the 16th century. Donato Bramante proposed a similar central plan with radiating chapels for his Tempieto, and later, on an even larger scale, in his plan for Saint Peter's Basilica (1485–1514). The central plan  was finally realized, with some modifications, beginning in 1547, in Saint Peter's by Michelangelo and then its completed version by Carlo Maderna.

Florence Cathedral dome (1420–1461)
Santa Maria del Fiore was the cathedral and symbol of Florence, which had been begun in 1296. After the death of the first architect, Arnolfo di Cambio, work was interrupted for fifty years. The campanile, or bell tower, was added by Giotto soon after 1330. Between 1334 and 1366 a committee of architects and painters made a plan of a proposed dome, and the constructors were sworn to follow the plan. It was larger than the dome of the ancient Pantheon, or any other dome in Europe, and no dome of that size had been built since antiquity.

A competition was held in 1418 to select the builder, and other competitors included his old rival Ghiberti. It was won by Brunelleschi, with the help of a brick scale model of the dome made for him by his friend the sculptor Donatello. Since buttresses were forbidden by the city fathers, and because obtaining rafters for scaffolding long and strong enough (and in sufficient quantity) for the task was impossible, how a dome of that size could be constructed without its collapsing under its own weight was unclear. Furthermore, the stresses of compression were not clearly understood, and the mortars used in the period would set only after several days, keeping the strain on the scaffolding for a long time.

The work on the dome (built 1420–1436), the lantern (built 1446–c. 1461) and the exedra (built 1439–1445) occupied most of the remainder of Brunelleschi's life. Brunelleschi's success can be attributed to his technical and mathematical genius. Brunelleschi used more than four million bricks in the construction of the octagonal dome. Notably, Brunelleschi left behind no building plans or diagrams detailing the dome's structure; scholars surmise that he constructed the dome as though it were hemispherical, which would have allowed the dome to support itself.

Brunelleschi constructed two domes, one within the other, a practice that would later be followed by all the successive major domes, including those of Les Invalides in Paris and the United States Capitol in Washington. The outer dome protected the inner dome from the rain, and allowed a higher and more majestic form. The frame of the dome is composed of twenty-eight horizontal and vertical marble ribs, or, eperoni, eight of which are visible on the outside. Those visible on the outside are largely decorative, since the outer dome is supported by the structure of the inner dome. A narrow stairway runs upward between the two domes to the lantern on the top.

Brunelleschi invented a new hoisting machine for raising the masonry needed for the dome, a task no doubt inspired by republication of Vitruvius' De architectura, which describes Roman machines used in the first century AD to build large structures such as the Pantheon and the Baths of Diocletian, structures still standing, which he would have seen for himself. This hoisting machine would be admired by Leonardo da Vinci years later.

The strength of the dome was improved by the wooden and sandstone chains invented by Brunelleschi, which acted like tensioning rings around the base of the dome and reduced the need for flying buttresses, so popular in Gothic architecture. The herringbone brick-laying pattern, which Brunelleschi may have seen in Rome, was also seemingly forgotten in Europe before the construction of the dome.

Brunelleschi kept his workers up in the building during their breaks and brought food and diluted wine, similar to that given to pregnant women at the time, up to them. He felt the trip up and down the hundreds of stairs would exhaust them and reduce their productivity.

Once the dome was completed, a new competition was held in 1436 for the decorative lantern on top of the dome, once again against his old rival Ghiberti. Brunelleschi won the competition and designed the structure and built the base for the lantern, but he did not live long enough to see its final installation atop the dome.

In 1438 Brunelleschi designed his last contribution to the cathedral;  four hemispherical exedra, or small half-domes, based on a Roman model, set against the drum at the base of the main dome. They alternated the four small domes arranged around the main dome, and gave the appearance of a stairway of domes mounting upward.  They were purely decorative, and were richly decorated with horizontal entablatures and vertical arches, pilasters. and double columns.  Their architectural elements  inspired later High Renaissance architecture, including the Tempietto of St. Peter built at Montorio by Bramante (1502). A similar structure appears the painting of an ideal city attributed to Piero della Francesca at Urbino (about 1475).

Accomplishments

Linear perspective

Besides his accomplishments in architecture, Brunelleschi is also generally credited as the first person to describe a precise system of linear perspective. This revolutionised painting and opened the way for the naturalistic styles of Renaissance art. He systematically studied exactly how and why objects, buildings, and landscapes changed and lines appeared to change shape when seen from a distance or from different angles, and made drawings of the Baptistry in Florence, Place San Giovanni and other Florence landmarks in correct perspective.

According to his early biographers Giorgio Vasari and Antonio Manetti, Brunelleschi conducted a series of experiments between 1415 and 1420, including making paintings with correct perspective of the Florence Baptistery and the Palazzo Vecchio, seen obliquely from its northwest corner, as well as the buildings of Place San Giovanni. According to Manetti, he used a grid or set of crosshairs to copy the exact scene square by square, and produced a reverse image. The results were compositions with accurate perspective, as seen through a mirror. To compare the accuracy of his image with the real object, he made a small hole in his painting, and had an observer look through the back of his painting to observe the scene. A mirror was then raised, reflecting Brunelleschi's composition, and the observer saw the striking similarity between the reality and painting. Both panels have since been lost.

Brunelleschi's studies on perspective were amplified by further studies of the topic by Leon Battista Alberti, Piero della Francesca and Leonardo da Vinci. Following the rules of perspective studied by Brunelleschi and the others, artists could paint imaginary landscapes and scenes with an accurate three-dimensional perspective and realism.  The most important treatise on a painting of the Renaissance, Della Pittura libri tre by Alberti, with a description of Brunelleschi's experiment, was published in 1436 and was dedicated to Brunelleschi. Thanks to Brunelleschi, a painting could be an accurate three-dimensional window onto the world.  The painting The Holy Trinity by Masaccio (1425–1427) in the Santa Maria Novella, Florence, was a good example of the new style, which accurately created the illusion of three dimensions and also recreated, in painting, Brunelleschi's architectural style.  This was the beginning of the standard method of painting studied by artists until the 19th century.

An innovative boat

In 1421, Brunelleschi was granted what is thought to be one of the first modern patents for his invention of a river transport vessel that was said to "bring in any merchandise and load on the river Arno etc for less money than usual, and with several other benefits." It was intended to be used to transport marble. In the history of patent law, Brunelleschi is, therefore, accorded a special place. In cultural and political terms, the grant of the patent was part of Brunelleschi's attempt to operate as a creative and commercial individual outside the constraints of the guilds and their monopolies.

He was also active in shipbuilding. In 1427 he built a large boat named Il Badalone to transport marble to Florence from Pisa up the River Arno. The ship sank on its maiden voyage, along with a sizable portion of Brunelleschi's personal fortune.

Other activities
Brunelleschi's interests extended to mathematics and engineering and the study of ancient monuments. He invented hydraulic machinery and elaborate clockwork, none of which survives.

Brunelleschi designed machinery for use in churches during theatrical religious performances that re-enacted Biblical miracle stories. Contrivances were created by which characters and angels were made to fly through the air in the midst of spectacular explosions of light and fireworks. These events took place during state and ecclesiastical visits. It is not known for certain how many of these Brunelleschi designed, but at least one, for the church of San Felice, is confirmed in the records.

Brunelleschi also designed fortifications used by Florence in its military struggles against Pisa and Siena. In 1424, he was working in Lastra a Signa, a village protecting the route to Pisa, and in 1431, in the south of Italy on the walls of the village of Staggia. These walls are still preserved, but whether they are specifically by Brunelleschi is uncertain.

In addition, he was somewhat involved in urban planning; he strategically positioned several of his buildings in relation to the nearby squares and streets for "maximum visibility". For example, demolitions in front of San Lorenzo were approved in 1433 to create a piazza facing the church. At Santo Spirito, he suggested that the façade be turned either towards the Arno so travellers would see it, or to the north, to face a large prospective piazza.

Personal life
Brunelleschi did not have children of his own, but in 1415, he adopted Andrea de Lazzaro Cavalcanti, who took the name Il Buggiano, after his birthplace.  He was Brunelleschi's sole heir.

Brunelleschi was a member of the guild of silk merchants, which included jewelers and goldsmiths, but not of the guild of stone and wood masters, which included architects. In 1434, he was arrested at the request of the guild of masters of stone and wood for practicing his trade illegally. He was quickly released and the stone and wood masters were charged with false imprisonment.

Location of remains

Brunelleschi's body lies in the crypt of the Cathedral of Florence. As explained by Antonio Manetti, who knew Brunelleschi and who wrote his biography, Brunelleschi "was granted such honours as to be buried in the Basilica di Santa Maria del Fiore, and with a marble bust, which was said to be carved from life, and placed there in perpetual memory with such a splendid epitaph." Inside the cathedral entrance is this epitaph: "Both the magnificent dome of this famous church and many other devices invented by Filippo the architect, bear witness to his superb skill. Therefore, in tribute to his exceptional talents, a grateful country that will always remember him buries him here in the soil below." A statue of Brunelleschi, looking up at his dome, was later placed in the square in front of the cathedral.

Fictional depictions
Brunelleschi is portrayed by Alessandro Preziosi in the 2016 television series Medici: Masters of Florence.

Principal works
The principal buildings and works designed by Brunelleschi or which included his involvement, all situated in Florence:
 Dome of the Florence Cathedral (1419–1436)
 Ospedale degli Innocenti (1419–ca.1445)
 The Basilica of San Lorenzo (1419–1480s)
 Meeting Hall of the Palazzo di Parte Guelfa (1420s–1445)
 Sagrestia Vecchia, or Old Sacristy of S. Lorenzo (1421–1440)
 Santa Maria degli Angeli: unfinished, (begun 1434)
 The lantern of Florence Cathedral (1436–ca.1450)
 The exedrae of Florence Cathedral (1439–1445)
 The church of Santo Spirito (1441–1481)
 Pazzi Chapel (1441–1460s)

See also
 Egg of Columbus
 Paolo dal Pozzo Toscanelli

References
Footnotes

Citations

Bibliography

Further reading

 
 
 
 
 
 
 
 
 
  (in line presentation)
 
 Vereycken, Karel, "The Secrets of the Florentine Dome", Schiller Institute, 2013. (Translation from the French, "Les secrets du dôme de Florence", la revue Fusion, n° 96, Mai, Juin 2003)
 "The Great Cathedral Mystery", PBS Nova TV documentary, February 12, 2014

External links

 Filippo Brunelleschi: Life & Main Works
  Free audio guide of Brunelleschi's Dome
 
Works at Open Library

Filippo Brunelleschi
Italian Renaissance architects
Italian civil engineers
1377 births
1446 deaths
Architects of cathedrals
Architects from Florence
14th-century people of the Republic of Florence
15th-century people of the Republic of Florence
Italian Roman Catholics
History of patent law
15th-century Italian engineers
15th-century Italian architects
15th-century Italian sculptors
Architects of Roman Catholic churches
Catholic sculptors